Six pack may refer to:

Collections of six objects of the same type
 Six pack (muscles), visible rectus abdominis muscles ("abs")
 Six-pack, a type of beverage multi-pack including six containers
Specifically, a multi-pack joined by six-pack rings
 A photo array used by police officers to conduct a police lineup
 The arrangement of six basic flight instruments in an aircraft
 Sixpack (European Union law), a set of European legislative measures

Arts and entertainment

Film and television
 Six Pack (film), a 1982 comedy/drama film
 Six Pack (TV series), 1992 Australian TV anthology series
 Six-Pack, a 2000 thriller film
 Sixpack (film), a 2011 Finnish film
 6pack, a 2008 Finnish TV series

Music
 Six Pack (band), a Serbian punk band
 Six Pack (The Police box set), 1980
 Six Pack (Gary Burton album) or the title song, 1992
 The Six Pack (ZZ Top box set), 1987
 Six Pack (EP) or the title song, by Black Flag, 1981
 6-Pack (EP), by Florida Georgia Line in 2020
 "Six Pak", song by The Revels
 "6 Pack", a song by Dune Rats from The Kids Will Know It's Bullshit, 2017
 Six-Pak, an extended play format created by Warner Bros. Records

Other
 Six Pack (comics), a team of fictional characters in the Marvel Comics universe
 The Six Pack, a former Sirius XM talk show and podcast
 Six-pack, a volleyball slang term for being hit directly in the face by a spiked ball

Technology
 Novell "6 Pack", codename for Novell NetWare 6.0
 Dodge Six Pack, a term for three two-barrel carburetors used on Dodge Challengers and other vehicles in the 1960s and 1970s

See also
 Joe Sixpack, proverbial name for an average person in the United States
 Operator of Uninspected Passenger Vessels License, colloquially called a 6-pack License
 Sixpack France, a French clothing brand
 Paramilitary punishment attacks in Northern Ireland, which include the "six pack"